Club de Fútbol Camagüey  is a Cuban football team playing in the Cuban National Football League and representing Camagüey Province. They have been staging their home games at Terreno Sebastopol in Minas, after leaving the Estádio Patricio Lumumba in Camagüey.

History
The team won 5 league titles between 1968 and 1977 when it was named Granjeros.

Since the 1970s, the FC Camagüey has occupied first places in Cuban football. In 2015, the team won the first place in the Cuban national championship.

Honors
 Campeonato Nacional de Fútbol de Cuba
Winners (6): 1968, 1969, 1970, 1975, 1977 (all as Granjeros), 2015

Current squad
2018 Season

References

Camaguey
Camagüey